The Serpent is the fourth release and second studio album by Still Remains, released on August 7, 2007 on Roadrunner Records. The first single to be released was the track "Stay Captive," which was followed by "Dancing with the Enemy". The lyrics and title for the song "Avalanche" are inspired by the role-playing video game Final Fantasy VII. The Serpent reached number 95 in the UK Albums Chart.

Track listing

Personnel
 T.J. Miller - lead vocals
 Mike Church -  guitar and backing vocals
 Jordan Whelan - guitar
 Steve Hetland - bass, additional vocals on "An Undesired Reunion"
 Ben Schauland - keyboards, additional vocals on "Sleepless Nights Alone"
 Adrian "Bone" Green - drums
Steve Evetts - production, engineering
Logan Mader and Lucas Banker - mixing
Allan Hessler - additional engineering, digital editing
Mike Gitter - A&R
Charles Dooher - art direction
Garett Zunt - art direction, package design
Todd Bell - photography

References

2007 albums
Roadrunner Records albums
Still Remains albums
Albums produced by Steve Evetts